Ecuador is scheduled to compete at the 2023 Pan n Games in Santiago, Chile from October 20 to November 5, 2023. This will be Ecuador's 19th appearance at the Pan American Games, having competed at every edition of the games.

Competitors
The following is the list of number of competitors (per gender) participating at the games per sport/discipline.

Archery

Ecuador qualified one archer during the 2022 Pan American Archery Championships.

Women

Bowling

Ecuador qualified a team of two men through the 2022 South American Games held in Asuncion, Paraguay.

Boxing

Ecuador qualified four boxers (four men) by reaching the final of the 2022 South American Games.

Men

Canoeing

Sprint
Ecuador qualified a total of one sprint athlete (one woman).

Women

Cycling

BMX
Ecuador qualified four cyclists (two men and two women) in BMX race through the UCI World Rankings.

Racing

Equestrian

Ecuador qualified a team of three equestrians in Dressage and Jumping in the 2022 South American Games.

Dressage

Jumping

Fencing

Ecuador qualified one female fencer through the 2022 Pan American Fencing Championships in Ascuncion, Paraguay.

Individual

Judo

Ecuador has qualified one male judoka after winning the category at the 2021 Junior Pan American Games.

Masculino

Karate

Ecuador qualified a team of 3 karatekas (two men and one woman) at the 2022 South American Games.

Kumite

Modern pentathlon

Ecuador qualified six modern pentathletes (three men and three women).

Roller sports

Figure
Ecuador qualified a female athlete in figure skating.

Sailing

Ecuador has qualified 2 boats for a total of 4 sailors.

Men

Mixed

Shooting

Ecuador qualified a total of six shooters after the 2022 Americas Shooting Championships. Ecuador also qualified two shooters during the 2022 South American Games.

Men
Pistol and rifle

Men
Shotgun

Women
Pistol and rifle

Wrestling

Ecuador qualified one wrestler (Women's Freestyle: 53 kg) through the 2022 Pan American Wrestling Championships held in Acapulco, Mexico. Ecuador also qualified one wrestler (Women's Freestyle: 50 kg) by winning the 2021 Junior Pan American Games.

Women

See also
Ecuador at the 2024 Summer Olympics

References

Nations at the 2023 Pan American Games
2023
2023 in Ecuadorian sport